Seasons is the final EP from the alternative rock band Tiger Please. A five-track EP recorded and released 2010.  Music videos for "Autumn Came the Fall" and "Spring & Its Offering" were released.

Track listing

Personnel
Tiger Please
 Leon Stanford – Vocals
 Tyla Campbell – Guitars
 Luc Morris - Guitars
 Jimmi Kendall - Bass
 Lewis Rowsell – Drums

References

2010 EPs
Walnut Tree Records EPs
Tiger Please albums
Albums produced by Romesh Dodangoda